Jahmek Power (born 30 June 1982), better known by his stage name Jammer, is a British grime MC, rapper, songwriter and record producer, known for being a member of Boy Better Know and a former member of N.A.S.T.Y Crew. Jammer also runs Lord of the Mics, a grime clash series released on DVD and well known in grime.

Biography 
Jammer was a member of the East London group N.A.S.T.Y Crew from 2000, and released a single under his own name, "Take U Out", in 2003 before departing from the group. He signed with Big Dada Recordings and released his first full-length, Jahmanji, in May 2010. In 2014, Jammer released what was meant to be his first album entitled "Top Producer" for free, in which all the tracks were recorded between 2004–2006. Jammer is a supporter of Arsenal F.C.

Lord of the Mics 

Jammer created the influential grime DVD series in his basement. During a cursing match with one of his friends, he envisioned the set up in his basement to be perfect for hosting clashes. This series skyrocketed in popularity following the famous clashes of Lord of the Mics 1 between Wiley and Kano, and Lord of the Mics 2 between Skepta and Devilman.

Discography

Albums
 Jahmanji (Big Dada, 2010)
 Living the Dream (Jahmek the World Productions, 2013)
 Top Producer (Jahmek the World Productions, 2014)
 Natural Selection (2020)

Mixtapes
 Are You Dumb? Vol. 1 (2006)
 Are You Dumb? Vol. 2 (2007)
 Are You Dumb? Vol. 3 (2008)
 Are You Dumb? Vol. 4 (2009)
 Are You Dumb? Vol. 5 (2018)

References 

1982 births
English people of Jamaican descent
Black British male rappers
Ninja Tune artists
English record producers
Grime music artists
Living people
Rappers from London
21st-century English musicians
21st-century British male musicians